Kshetri may refer to:
 an alternative spelling of Chhetri
 a shortened form of Kshetrimayum